Lower Tanana (also Tanana and/or Middle Tanana) is an endangered language spoken in Interior Alaska in the lower Tanana River villages of Minto and Nenana. Of about 380 Tanana people in the two villages, about 30 still speak the language. As of 2010, “Speakers who grew up with Lower Tanana as their first language can be found only in the 250-person village of Minto.” It is one of the large family of Athabaskan languages, also known as Dené.

The Athabaskan (or Dené) bands who formerly occupied a territory between the Salcha and the Goodpaster rivers spoke a distinct dialect that linguists term the Middle Tanana language.

Dialects 
Toklat area dialect
Minto Flats-Nenana River dialect: Minto and Nenana
Chena River dialect: Chena Village
Salcha River dialect: Salcha

Vocabulary samples 
 “man”
 “woman”
 “my grandfather”
 “my grandmother”
 “clan”
 “mountain”
 “black bear”
 "brown bear"
 “caribou”
 “dog”
 “his/her dog”
 “willow”
 “moccasin”
 “canoe”
 “Northern Lights”
 “trail”
 “river”
 “girl” (Middle Tanana)

Phonology

Consonants

Vowels 

Songs 
In a 2008–2009 project, linguist Siri Tuttle of the University of Alaska's Native Language Center “worked with elders to translate and document song lyrics, some on file at the language center and some recorded during the project.”

“The Minto dialect of Tanana ... allows speakers to occasionally change the number of syllables in longer words.”

Notes

Bibliography
 Charlie, Teddy. 1992. Ode Setl'oghwnh Da': Long After I Am Gone, Fairbanks: Alaska Native Language Center. 
 Kari, James, Isabel Charlie, Peter John & Evelyn Alexander. 1991. Lower Tanana Athabaskan Listening and Writing Exercises, Fairbanks: Alaska Native Language Center.
 Tuttle, Siri. 1998. Metrical and Tonal Structures in Tanana Athabaskan, Ph.D. Dissertation, University of Washington.
 Tuttle, Siri. 2003. Archival Phonetics: Tone and Stress in Tanana Athabaskan. University of Alaska Fairbanks.

External links
 Lower Tanana basic lexicon at the Global Lexicostatistical Database

Tanana Athabaskans
Northern Athabaskan languages
Indigenous languages of Alaska
Indigenous languages of the North American Subarctic
Endangered Dené–Yeniseian languages
Native American language revitalization
Official languages of Alaska